James, Jimmy or Jim Willis may refer to:

 James Willis (American football) (born 1972), American football player and defensive coordinator 
 James Willis (admiral) (1923–2003), Royal Australian Navy officer
 James Hamlyn Willis (1910–1995), Australian botanist
 Jim Willis (1930s pitcher), Negro leagues baseball player
 Jim Willis (1950s pitcher) (James Gladden Willis, born 1927), baseball pitcher
 Jim Willis (footballer) (1891–1980), Australian rules footballer
 Jimmy Willis (James Anthony Willis, born 1968), English footballer

See also